State Route 103 (SR 103) is a state highway in the U.S. state of California that forms part of the Terminal Island Freeway in Los Angeles and Long Beach. It runs from State Route 47 near Terminal Island north to State Route 1 (Pacific Coast Highway) in Long Beach. At the south end of SR 103, the Terminal Island Freeway runs south with SR 47 over the Commodore Schuyler F. Heim Bridge to its end at Ocean Boulevard on Terminal Island, at the former Long Beach Naval Shipyard. SR 47 then turns west there to its end at Interstate 110.

Beyond SR 1, the freeway is owned by the City of Long Beach to its end at Willow Street. For a time, this segment had the unusual unsigned designation of State Route 103U, with the U signifying "un-relinquished", because the state legislature had removed this segment from the state highway system in 1983 but the City of Long Beach did not agree to take it over until 2000. The portion is still signed as part of SR 103 instead of SR 103U.

SR 103 does not directly connect to any other freeways. It was originally planned to continue north to the Interstate 710 and Interstate 405 interchange. The Terminal Island Freeway is heavily used by trucks carrying cargo to and from the Port of Los Angeles and Port of Long Beach. Because of its isolation from residential and business areas, and the industrial-looking neighborhood it runs through, the freeway is frequently used to film freeway scenes for major motion pictures. Terminator 2: Judgment Day, Mr. & Mrs. Smith, and The Fast and the Furious were three movies that used it for location purposes.

Route description
The state route begins at Interstate 710 in Long Beach, where it instantly begins an commingle with SR 47. It then begins as a freeway, whence it follows the Schuyler Heim Bridge over the Cerritos Channel, entering the city of Los Angeles midway through the bridge. It then leaves SR 47 and reenters Long Beach, where it meets SR 1. The SR 103 state highway designation officially ends at SR 1, but the freeway, now controlled by the City of Long Beach from this point on, continues north and ends at an intersection with Willow Street.

SR 103 is part of the California Freeway and Expressway System, and is part of the National Highway System, a network of highways that are considered essential to the country's economy, defense, and mobility by the Federal Highway Administration.

History
Prior to 1969, Route 103 was what is now State Route 15 and Interstate 15 from Interstate 5 to State Route 163 in San Diego. (I-15 was U.S. Route 395, which used SR 163, until 1969.)

The entire Terminal Island Freeway was once part of State Route 47, and was to continue north to Interstate 10 near downtown Los Angeles. SR 47 was redefined in 1983 to split from the freeway north of the Schuyler Heim Bridge, and the part from SR 47 to Willow Street became SR 103. The part north of SR 1 was later removed from the legal definition, existing for a time as State Route 103U - U for unrelinquished - before it was traded on August 25, 2000, with the city of Long Beach for Interstate 710 from SR 1 south to Ocean Boulevard. The city has since explored plans to remove this portion of the freeway.

Exit list

See also

References

External links

AARoads - State Route 47/103
Caltrans: Route 103 highway conditions
California Highways: SR 103

103
103
State Route 103
State Route 103
Terminal Island